The 14th Canadian Film Awards were held on May 26, 1962 to honour achievements in Canadian film. The ceremony was hosted by Andrew Stewart, Chairman of the Board of Broadcast Governors.

Winners
Film of the Year: Not awarded
Feature Film: No entries submitted
Theatrical Short: Morning on the Lièvre — National Film Board of Canada, David Bairstow producer and director
TV Information: William Lyon Mackenzie: A Friend to His Country — National Film Board of Canada, Julian Biggs producer and director
TV Entertainment: Word Game — Canadian Broadcasting Corporation, Philip Keatley producer
Films for Children: Dance Squared — National Film Board of Canada, Frank Spiller producer, René Jodoin director
Travel and Recreation: Glooscap Country — Nova Scotia Information Service, Margaret Perry producer and director
General Information: Circle of the Sun — National Film Board of Canada, Tom Daly producer, Colin Low director
Public Relations: Campus on the Move — Crawley Films, Peter Cock producer and director
Abitibi — Crawley Films, F. R. Crawley producer, René Bonnière director
Sales Promotion: Project Sentinel — Crawley Films, James Turpie producer and director
Training and Instruction: You Can Go a Long Way — Meridian Films
Filmed Commercial, Company or Product: Molson's "Fishing" — Omega Productions, Henri Michaud producer
Filmed Commercial, Public Service: Pot-pourri — National Film Board of Canada  —  Colin Low and Victor Jobin producers, Jeff Hale, Austin Campbell, Derek Lamb, Kaj Pindal, Grant Munro, Cameron Guess and Rhoda Leyer directors
Amateur: Au temps des ombres blanches — Claude Savard director
Certificate of Merit: The Boy Next Door — Leonard John Getgood producer and director
Certificate of Merit: With a Grain of Salt — Peter Gerretsen director
Certificate of Merit: The Castle — Ernest Frederick Attridge director
Certificate of Merit: Boom — Gordon Kuskey director

Special Award
O. J. Silverthorne, Chairman Ontario Board of Censors - "for his generous interest in the problems of filmmakers, film users and film viewers, and his helpfulness to the Canadian Film Awards and to the film society movement."

References

Canadian
Canadian Film Awards (1949–1978)
1962 in Canada